Marlana Danieal VanHoose (born June 25, 1995) is an American contemporary Christian singer. She achieved fame by singing the National Anthem at major professional sporting events.

Biography
VanHoose was born in Columbus, Ohio on June 25, 1995, and was the first of two children born to David VanHoose, a correctional officer in the federal prison system and Teresa (née Blair) VanHoose, a school teacher. VanHoose was born with Cytomegalovirus (CMV) which hindered the development of her optic nerve, rendering her blind at birth and a diagnosis that she would not live past one year of age. After her first year her parents were told that the virus was in remission. At the age of two, VanHoose was diagnosed with a mild case of cerebral palsy.

Career
At two years old, VanHoose began playing the piano and humming the gospel classic, "Jesus Loves Me." Her first major performance was in 2012, in which she sang the National Anthem at a University of Kentucky Women's Basketball game. A spectator filmed the performance and placed it on YouTube and the video went viral. VanHoose subsequently joined the Artists Music Guild, a professional artists relations and protection firm, in 2011, and they currently handle her career and have launched her to a worldwide audience. In 2013, the CBS Evening News aired a complete story on VanHoose entitled, "Teen's Big Voice Shatters Obstacles." She has been featured on other entertainment shows such as Entertainment Tonight and Inside Edition. A feature story about VanHoose and the UK Women's Basketball, entitled, "Loud and Proud" was aired by ESPN-E-60. VanHoose sung for the 2015 NBA Playoffs and game six of the 2015 NBA Finals. She has performed at three various NASCAR Sprint Cup Series Races. In 2016, VanHoose performed at Carnegie Hall as a premier guest. She was the official anthem singer for the 2016 Republican National Convention and appeared on Good Morning America the next morning from the floor of the convention center. In December 2016, VanHoose opened the New York Rangers game at Madison Square Garden to an audience of over twenty thousand in attendance.

Music
VanHoose recorded her first major project in 2013 entitled, "Do Right." The project was written and produced for her by fellow Christian recording artist David L Cook and Elddy Trevino and released under DLC Records. Cook took over VanHoose' management in 2012 and launched her onto a national level which included performing for the 2016 Republican National Convention and the 2017 Republican Inauguration Concert Series. VanHoose sang for the presidential concerts at the Lincoln Memorial on the Mall as well as being the featured artist for the Day of Prayer at the National Cathedral on January 22, 2017. VanHoose was the only performer of the day given a standing ovation led by Melania Trump after being moved to tears by her rendition of the classic gospel hymn, "How Great Thou Art.".

Awards
2012 recipient for AMG Heritage Award winners New Artist of the Year
2013 & 2014 nominee for AMG Heritage Award winners Artist of the Year.
2014 nomination for AMG Heritage Award winners Young Artist of the Year
2015 recipient for AMG Heritage Award winners Youth Artist of the Year
Commissioned a Kentucky Colonel

References

1995 births
Living people
American child musicians
People from Kentucky
Singers from Kentucky
Kentucky women musicians
21st-century American singers
21st-century American women